Divina is a village and municipality in northern Slovakia.

Divina may also refer to:

Fauna
 Argyropeza divina, a species of sea snail
 Calidota divina, a moth of the family Erebidae
 Nemophora divina, a moth of the Adelidae family
 Stigmella divina, a moth of the family Nepticulidae

Other
 Divina (name)
 Divina (typeface)
 La Divina, a nickname for Marie Callas (1923–1977), Greek operatic soprano
 Divina, the soundtrack to Divina, está en tu corazón, a Spanish-language telenovela
 Divina proportione, a book on mathematics written by Luca Pacioli and illustrated by Leonardo da Vinci (1509)
 , a 2011 cruise ship

See also
 Divina Pastora (disambiguation)